Inhibitor of CDK, cyclin A1 interacting protein 1 is a protein that in humans is encoded by the INCA1 gene.

References

Further reading